Butterfly Crush is a 2010 film, written and directed by New Zealand filmmaker Alan Clay. It was adapted from his novel Dance Sisters. The story is about an Australian female song and dance duo whose chance at success is jeopardized when one of them gets involved with a cult group.

Plot
Moana and Eva are the song and dance duo "Butterfly Crush". During a performance at Circular Quay in Sydney, a riot engulfs their show. In the midst of the riot, Moana awakens, to discover that the performance and riot was just a virtual dream. She is in the building of the Dreamguides, a cult operating in the Kings Cross neighborhood of Sydney. Eva has recently become involved with the Dreamguides.

Moana and Eva plan to enter the "Australasian Song Awards" contest and become a big success. This plan starts to evaporate, as Eva slips further into the Dreamguides. She is under the influence of the cult's magnetic leader, Star, who tries to take control of the duo's management.

Despite her distrust of the cult, Moana finds herself being drawn in by an attractive young cult member, Matt. He shows her how the virtual dreaming technology can combine with physical lovemaking to create a new experience of passion.

Deceived and controlled by Star, Eva quits the duo. Moana realizes she must find a way to turn the tables on Star, if she wants to get Eva and Butterfly Crush back.  She attempts to trap Star, but it backfires when Star succeeds in undermining her faith in herself. Moana is left badly shaken; she wanders around Sydney, lost and dazed.

Moana and the duo's manager, Angel, force Star to allow Eva to perform with Moana at the Awards, and they win. Matt decides to leave the cult and escapes his cult minders to join the duo to celebrate the win.

Cast
Courtney Hale as Moana
Hayley Fielding as Eva
Richard Adams as Matt
Amelia Shankley as Star
Sally Kelleher as Angel

Production

Development
Alan Clay adapted his novel Dance Sisters over a two-year period in 2007/8. The characters and style of the film were developed over three two-week podcast shoots in 2009 where the musical numbers were also recorded, and music videos shot. Podcasts of the central characters were posted on the Internet; audience feedback from the podcasts shaped the development of the film's style.

Clay worked with the young cast over a period of 14 months, using a process involving yoga and emotional warmups.

Casting
Over 200 actors auditioned in Melbourne, Sydney, Auckland, and Wellington for the lead roles. The cast includes first-time film performers Courtney Hale (Moana), Hayley Fielding (Eva), and Richard Adams (Matt).

Amelia Shankley plays the cult leader Star. As a child actor, she won the Best Actress award of the Paris Film Festival for the feature film Dreamchild, as Alice Liddell, the girl who inspired Lewis Carroll's Alice in Wonderland.

Locations
The film is set in Sydney. Exteriors were shot there in December 2009, with scenes set at Darling Harbour, Circular Quay, and Kings Cross. All the interior scenes were shot in Wanganui, New Zealand.

Awards
 Accolade Award of Excellence, Best Supporting Actor – Amelia Shankley
 Anthem Film Festival, Best International Narrative Feature award
 Indie Gathering International Film Festival, Best Feature Drama
 Reel Independent Film Extravaganza, Best Feature Drama

Release
The film was released in New Zealand in 2010, and in Australia in April 2012. It was distributed in North American on DVD and TV by Vanguard Cinema and Video On Demand by Indie Rights.

References

External links 
 Artmedia Productions
 

Films shot in New Zealand
New Zealand independent films
Australian musical drama films
Films shot in Sydney
Films set in Australia
Films based on New Zealand novels
2010 films
2010s English-language films
2010s musical drama films
New Zealand musical drama films
2010 independent films